Virginia Euwer Wolff (born August 25, 1937) is an American author of children's literature.
Her award-winning series Make Lemonade features a 14-year-old girl named LaVaughn, who babysits for the children of a 17-year-old single mother. There are three books. The second, True Believer, won the 2001 National Book Award for Young People's Literature.
The second and third, This Full House (2009), garnered Kirkus Reviews starred reviews. She was the recipient of the 2011 NSK Neustadt Prize for Children's Literature, honoring her entire body of work.

Biography

Virginia Euwer Wolff was born in Portland, Oregon in 1937. She grew up in a log house with no electricity, on an apple and pear orchard. In 1945, she began violin lessons, which fermented her love of music. She attended the girls' school St. Helen's Hall (now Oregon Episcopal School) and Smith College. She married Arthur Richard Wolff in 1959. They divorced in 1976.

In 2003, St. Helen's Hall honored Wolff with a Distinguished Alumna Award. She has lived in New York, Philadelphia, and Washington D.C., but now reads, writes, and plays chamber music in Oregon.

Books 

This Full House First ed. New York: HarperCollins Children's Books 2009.  — concluding the Lemonade trilogy
 Kirkus Review (starred) 02/01/2009
True Believer First ed. New York: Atheneum Books for Young Readers, 2001.     — sequel to Make Lemonade
 Kirkus Review (starred) 02/01/2001
Award: 2001 National Book Award, Young People's Literature (U.S.)
Award: Best Children's Books 2001 by Publishers Weekly.
Junior Library Guild Selection
Top Ten Book of the Year from the Young Adult Library Services Association
Bat 6 Henry Holt and Co., 1998 
 Kirkus Review 05/01/1998
Oregon Reads 2009 Selection
Make Lemonade.  First ed., Henry Holt and Co., 1993  (and many other editions)
 Kirkus Review 05/01/1993
Citation: American Library Association Notable Children's Book

Award: Booklist Top of the List winner
The Mozart Season. First ed. New York: Henry Holt and Co., 1991.
 Kirkus Review 05/15/1991
Award: 2011 Phoenix Award from the Children's Literature Association as the best English-language children's book that did not a major award when it was originally published twenty years earlier. That is named for the mythical bird phoenix, which is reborn from its ashes, to suggest the book's rise from obscurity.
Probably Still Nick Swansen. First ed. New York: Henry Holt and Co., 1988.
Rated PG New York: St. Martin's Press, 1981.

See also

Notes

References

External links
 

1937 births
American children's writers
National Book Award for Young People's Literature winners
Smith College alumni
Writers from Portland, Oregon
Living people
Oregon Episcopal School alumni